Oroluk Island is one of the islets of Oroluk Atoll, part of the State of Pohnpei (Federated States of Micronesia).
Oroluk is currently uninhabited and is 0.13 km2 in size. It was formerly inhabited. The main industry was agriculture and fishing.

History
The Oroluk Atoll was discovered by Spanish navigator Alonso de Arellano in 1565 on board of the patache San Lucas, who charted it as Mira Cómo Vas (Look how you're going in Spanish). It was also later visited by the Spanish naval officer Felipe Tompson on 7 April 1773, who charted it as the Bajo Triste (the Sad Shoal in Spanish) due to its "horrible aspect" in his own words. Oroluk Island was charted by Tompson as San Agustín.

See also

 Desert island
 List of islands

References

Islands of Pohnpei
Uninhabited islands of the Federated States of Micronesia